Pahi were the traditional double-hulled sailing watercraft of Tahiti. They were large, two masted, and rigged with crab claw sails.

References

Multihulls
Sailing ships
Tahiti